Jamaica first participated at the Olympic Games in 1948, and has sent athletes to compete in every Summer Olympic Games since then. In 1960, Jamaican athletes competed as part of the West Indies Federation team.
Jamaica has also participated in the Winter Olympic Games since 1988, with the Jamaica national bobsleigh team achieving some fame.

Jamaican athletes have won a total of 87 medals, with all but one medal won in athletics, and all but three of those in the individual and relay sprint events.

The National Olympic Committee for Jamaica is the Jamaica Olympic Association, and was founded in 1936.

Participation

Timeline of participation

Medal tables

Medals by Summer Games

Medals by Winter Games

Medals by sport

List of medalists

See also
 List of flag bearers for Jamaica at the Olympics
 Tropical nations at the Winter Olympics

External links
 
 
 

 
Olympics